Buhi can mean:
Buhi, Camarines Sur, Philippines
Lake Buhi, Philippines
BuHi, nickname for the Buford Highway  community near Atlanta, Georgia, United States